London Luton Airport  is an international airport located in Luton, Bedfordshire, England, situated  east of the town centre, and  north of Central London. The airport is owned by London Luton Airport Ltd (LLAL), a company wholly owned by Luton Borough Council, and operated by London Luton Airport Operations Ltd (LLAOL).

An airport was opened on the site on 16 July 1938. During the Second World War, the airport was used by fighters of the Royal Air Force. Commercial activity and general aviation flight training at Luton resumed during 1952. By the 1960s, Luton Airport was playing a key role in the development of the package holiday business; by 1969, a fifth of all holiday flights from the UK departed from Luton Airport. From the mid-1960s, executive aircraft have been based at the airport. During the late 1970s, an expansion plan was initiated at Luton to accommodate as many as 5 million passengers per year, although the airport experienced a reduction in passenger numbers in the 1980s. In 1990, the airport was renamed London Luton Airport to try and emphasise the airport's proximity to the capital.

The arrival of new operators at Luton during the 1990s, such as charter operator MyTravel Group and new low-cost scheduled flights from Debonair and EasyJet, contributed to a rapid increase in passenger numbers that made it the fastest growing major airport in the UK. In August 1997, to fund an £80million extension of the airport, a 30-year concession contract was issued to a public-private partnership consortium, London Luton Airport Operations Limited. Throughout the 1990s, £30million was invested in Luton's infrastructure and facilities. In November 1999, a new £40million terminal was opened by Queen Elizabeth II and Prince Philip; the new building houses 60 check-in desks, baggage and flight information systems and a range of commercial outlets. During 2004/5, the departure and arrivals lounges and other facilities were redeveloped at a cost of £38million.

In 2018, over 16.5 million passengers passed through the airport, a record total for Luton making it the fifth 
busiest airport in the UK. It is the fourth-largest airport serving the London area after Heathrow, Gatwick and Stansted, and is one of London's six international airports along with London City and Southend. The airport serves as a base for EasyJet, TUI Airways, Ryanair and Wizz Air and previously served as a base for Monarch Airlines until it ceased operations in October 2017. The vast majority of the routes served are within Europe, although there are some charter and scheduled routes to destinations in Northern Africa and Asia.

History

Early history
Luton Municipal Airport was opened on the site on 16 July 1938 by the Secretary of State for Air, Kingsley Wood. Situated where the valley of the River Lea cuts its way through the north-east end of the Chiltern Hills, the airport occupies a hill-top location, with a roughly  drop-off at the western end of the runway. The airport, which was owned by the Borough of Luton, was considered to be the northern terminal for neighbouring London.

During the Second World War, the airport was used by the Royal Air Force, fighters of No. 264 Squadron being based there. Following the end of the conflict, the site was returned to the local council. During 1952, activity at the airport resumed on a commercial basis; a new control tower was opened around this time.

British aviation company Percival Aircraft had its factory at the airport until the early 1960s. From the mid-1960s, executive aircraft have been based at the airport, initially operated by McAlpine Aviation. These activities have grown and several executive jet operators and maintenance companies are currently based at Luton.

In the 1960s, Luton Airport played a key role in the development of the package holiday business, in which the popularity of the foreign holiday rose substantially, as the launch of new services had allowed greater numbers of people to travel abroad for the first time. Luton became the operating base for several charter airlines, such as Autair (which went on to become Court Line), Euravia (now TUI Airways, following Euravia's change of name to Britannia Airways and subsequent merger with First Choice Airways and TUI rebrand) and Dan-Air.

By 1969, a fifth of all holiday flights from the UK departed from Luton Airport; during 1972, Luton Airport was the most profitable airport in the country. However, Luton suffered a severe setback in August 1974 when major package holiday operator Clarksons and its in-house airline Court Line (which also operated coach links) ceased operations and were liquidated. Nevertheless, by 1978, the airport's management initiated an expansion plan as to allow Luton to accommodate as many as 5 million passengers per year.

1980s and 1990s

During the 1980s, the airport experienced a decline in customer numbers; this was due to lack of reinvestment while the nearby Stansted Airport, which was also located north of London, was growing. The council responded to lobbying and focused again on developing the airport. During 1985, a new international terminal building was opened by Charles III (the Prince of Wales at the time). Further updates and changes over the following 15 years were made, including the opening of a new international terminal and automated baggage handling facility, a new control tower with updated air traffic control systems, a new cargo centre and runway upgrades. In 1987, Luton Airport became a limited company, of which Luton Borough Council was the sole shareholder; this reorganisation was taken as it was felt that the airport ought to be operated at arm's length via an independent management team.

While developing the basic infrastructure, various business partners were courted and business models were considered. The process envisaged a cargo centre, an airport railway station, and people mover from station to airport terminal (hence the unused underpass parallel to the road as one approaches the terminal). During 1991, an attempt was made to sell Luton Airport, but it was unsuccessful; instead, a new management team was appointed to turn around the business, stem the losses, and improve passenger numbers. Over the following five years, £30million was invested in Luton's infrastructure and facilities.

Originally, the airport's runways had been grass tracks 18/36 and 06/24, and then a concrete runway 08/26. By the end of the 1980s, there was only one runway, 08/26. The 18/36 grass runway had disappeared under a landfill, while 06/24 had effectively become a taxiway. For Luton to maintain viability, it was necessary to update airfield services, and achieve CAT III status. This meant updating the instrument landing system (ILS); glidepath and localiser and removing the hump in the runway; even a six-foot person could not see one end of the runway from the other. The hump was removed by building up layers at the end of the runway; this was done over 72 successive nights between October 1988 and February 1989, with the height being raised 90 mm on one particular night. During the course of this work, the airport would re-open for flights during the day.

In 1990, the airport was renamed London Luton Airport to re-emphasise the airport's proximity to the UK capital. In 1991, another setback occurred when Ryanair, which had flown from the airport to Ireland for a number of years, transferred its London operating base from Luton to rival Stansted. This move was attributed as causing a decline in passenger numbers at Luton. Later in the 1990s, MyTravel Group began charter flights from the airport, using the Airtours brand and new low-cost scheduled flights from Debonair and easyJet, the latter making Luton its base. The arrival of these new operators marked a rapid increase in passenger numbers; during 1997/1998, 3.4 million people travelled via the airport, while 4.4 million travellers were recording during the following year, making Luton Airport the fastest growing major airport in the UK.

In August 1997, to fund an £80million extension of the airport, the council issued a 30-year concession contract to a public-private partnership consortium, London Luton Airport Operations Limited, a partnership of Airport Group International (AGI) and Barclays Private Equity. AGI was a specialist airport management and development company once owned by Lockheed Martin. In 1999, AGI was sold to TBI plc; in 2001, Barclays also sold its shares in Luton to TBI plc.

The main feature of the development phase in 1998 was a £40million terminal made from aluminium and glass, based on an original design by Foster + Partners. The new terminal, which was officially opened in November 1999 by Queen Elizabeth II and Prince Philip, houses 60 check-in desks, baggage and flight information systems and a wide range of shops, restaurants and bars. During late 1999, British railway infrastructure company Railtrack opened the new Luton Airport Parkway railway station; built at a cost of £23million, the station facilitated a travel time to central London of less than 30 minutes.

Development since the 2000s

In September 2004, Luton Airport embarked on a 10-month project to develop the departure and arrivals lounges and other facilities at a cost of £38million; this work included a  area featuring a spectacular vaulted ceiling was completed with the new terminal, but intended to lie unused until required. On 1 July 2005, the new departure hall opened on schedule, featuring a boarding pier extending  out between the airport's north and east aprons and relocated security, customs and immigration facilities, as well as an expanded number of boarding gates from the previous number of 19 to 26.

In 2004, the airport management announced that they supported the government plans to expand the facilities, which included a full-length runway and a new terminal. However, local campaign groups, including Luton and District Association for the Control of Aircraft Noise (LADACAN) and Stop Luton Airport Plan (SLAP) opposed the new expansion plans, for reasons including noise pollution and traffic concerns; LADACAN also claimed that various sites, including Someries Castle, a Scheduled Monument, would be threatened by the expansion. On 6 July 2007, it was announced that the owners of London Luton Airport had decided to scrap plans to build a second runway and new terminal for financial reasons. In order for the airport to expand further, the Department for Transport (DfT) advised the airport authority to use the airport site more efficiently. A full-length runway would increase airlines' operational flexibility by enabling the use of aircraft that have a greater payload capacity and longer range than is currently possible. A longer taxiway would maximise runway use by reducing the need for taxiing aircraft to cross or move along the runway.

In January 2005, London Luton Airport Operations Limited was acquired by Airport Concessions Development Limited, a company owned by Abertis Infraestructuras (90%) and Aena Internacional (10%), both Spanish companies. In November 2013, ownership of London Luton Airport Operations Ltd passed to Aena and Ardian. In April 2018, AMP Capital acquired Ardian's 49% stake in the business.

By 2006, the last flight training operator had ceased training from the airport.

From 2006 to 2008, Silverjet operated long-haul flights to Newark and Dubai from a dedicated terminal, but ceased operations due to the global economic crisis.

In September 2016, La Compagnie announced it would cease operating its Luton to Newark service citing economic reasons. Therefore, Luton lost its only long-haul service. In February 2017, Hungarian low-cost carrier Wizz Air announced it would to open its first British base at Luton Airport inaugurating three new routes to Tel Aviv, Pristina and Kutaisi in addition to more than a dozen already served ones from other bases.

In December 2018, a three-year redevelopment of the airport commenced. Costing roughly £160million, the airport management stated that the upgrade, which included new shops, a new boarding pier, and more boarding gates, would increase overall capacity by 50%, enabling the site to accommodate 18 million passengers by 2020. Campaigners from local pressure groups such as LADACAN have complained that the airport had failed to incorporate reduce noise reduction measures into the plan, while an airport spokesman stated "Our noise control measures are some of the most stringent of any major UK airport", noting that it had applied for additional flight restrictions. In addition, earlier that year, work had commenced on the construction of the Luton DART, an automated guided people mover which will travel between Luton Airport Parkway station and the airport. With costs estimated at £200million, DART is projected to eliminate the need for shuttle buses from mid-2022.

Facilities

The runway is equipped with an Instrument Landing System (ILS) rated to Category IIIB, allowing the airport to continue operating in conditions of poor visibility.

All the airport facilities lie to the north of the runway. The terminal and aprons have an unconventional layout for a commercial airport, with terminal drop-off, bus stands, taxi ranks and short-term car parks being accessed facing south towards the runway, being connected by a road. This road tunnels under a taxiway which connects the western apron area to the runway's taxiway network. There are approximately 60 stands available for aircraft, with 28 dedicated gates, which are all hardstands. All of these stands are located on the northern side of the terminal building, away from the runway and connected to it by a 'U' shaped set of taxiways and aprons that together encircle the terminal.

The northern side of the U-shaped apron is ringed by a continuous line of hangars and other buildings, emphasising the fact that Luton is a major maintenance base for several airlines including TUI Airways, EasyJet, and previously Monarch Airlines. By contrast to the heavily built up apron area, the airport's southern boundary is entirely rural with only a few isolated farm buildings and houses close to the airport boundary.

The airport remains in municipal ownership, owned by Luton Borough Council but managed by the private sector London Luton Airport Operations Limited (LLAOL). London Luton Airport has a Civil Aviation Authority Public Use Aerodrome Licence (Number P835) that allows flights for the public transport of passengers or for flying instruction. An indicator of the importance of the airport to the economy of Luton is that Luton is reported to have the highest number of taxicabs per head of population in the United Kingdom.

Hangar 89, built in 1974, has  of office space and can house two aircraft the size of an Airbus A320 or Boeing 737 at one time. When EasyJet received H89, it had a 1970s style office setup. EasyJet modernised the building and painted it orange.

In addition, TUI Airways head office is at the airport, and — prior to its closure — Monarch Airlines, along with that of Monarch Group, was in Prospect House, on the grounds of the airport.

Terminal
Luton Airport has a single, two-storey passenger terminal building which has been expanded and rearranged several times. The ground floor has a main hall equipped with 62 check-in desks (1-62), a separate security screening hall, as well as some shops, service counters and the arrivals facilities. After the security screening hall, stairs lead to the departures lounge on the upper floor, where several more stores, restaurants and all 43 departure gates in three side piers (1-19,  20-28 and 30-43) can be found. Besides branches of Burger King, Starbucks, Boots and others, one airport lounge is located inside the terminal.

Airlines and destinations

Passenger

The following airlines operate regular scheduled flights to and from Luton:

Cargo

Statistics

Traffic development

Busiest routes

Ground transport

Road
The airport lies a few miles away from the M1 motorway, which runs southwards to the M25 motorway and London, and northwards to Milton Keynes, the Midlands and the north of England. The airport is linked to M1's Junction 10 by the dual-carriageway A1081 road. There is a short stay car park adjacent to the terminal, together with medium and long term on airport car parks to the west and east of the terminal respectively and linked to the terminal by shuttle buses. Pre-booked off airport parking is also available from several independent operators.

Rail

Luton Airport Parkway has served the airport since 1999. It is on the Midland Main Line from London St Pancras, between which, journeys take as little as 22 minutes, on services branded EMR.

Thameslink is the primary operator, with services running from the station to Bedford, St Albans, London, Rainham, Gatwick Airport and Brighton.
East Midlands Railway operate semi-fast services calling at the station twice hourly. These trains run south directly to London St Pancras and north to Corby via Bedford, Wellingborough and Kettering. Limited services to Nottingham and Sheffield call at the station at peak times.

In 2016, Luton Airport commissioned a study, with the support of the CBI, easyJet, the Federation of Small Businesses, and the Bedfordshire and the Hertfordshire Chambers of Commerce (among others) which sought to explore opportunities to expand rail services to and from the airport. The study found four fast trains per hour from central London was possible.

Negotiations are underway with the Department for Transport to extend the validity of the Oyster card contactless ticketing system to the airport. Contactless bank cards (but not Oyster cards) became valid for journeys to and from London from October 2019.

Airport transit

A light rail/automated guided people mover, Luton DART, provides a connection between the aiport terminal and the railway station. The transit was officially opened by King Charles III in December 2022. It opened to passengers on 10 March 2023 and is currently operating a limited service for four hours per day, with a planned 24-hour service coming into effect around the end of the month. When fully operational, the DART transit will replace the shuttle bus service.

The single fare for the DART is £4.90. Rail tickets marked "Luton Airport" include the price of the DART transit. Concessions are given to Luton residents, and free travel is provided for holders of concessionary travel passes and disabled blue badge holders, and for airport workers.

Buses

Local buses connect Luton Airport with Luton town centre and other nearby places.

The airport is served by the Route A of the Luton to Dunstable Busway, a bus rapid transit route which connects the airport with Luton Town Centre and the neighbouring towns of Dunstable, Houghton Regis and Milton Keynes. The buses, operated by Arriva Shires & Essex, run on a segregated guided busway track between Luton and Dunstable.

Conventional bus services also operate, connecting the airport with towns and cities in the region and parts of north London, including the 100, operated by Arriva, which offers an hourly daytime connection to the nearby towns of Hitchin and Stevenage; Metroline service 84A; Courtney Buses coach service to Bracknell.

Direct coach services to London include Green Line route 757 operated by Arriva Shires & Essex and the A1 operated by National Express which operate competing services to and from Victoria Coach Station. EasyBus services operate towards Liverpool Street station. A range of longer distance National Express services linking Stansted, Heathrow and Gatwick Airports as well as destinations in the Midlands and North of England.

There are also three services around the airport operated by APCOA Parking which operate 24 hours a day serving the terminal, mid stay, long stay, and staff car parks. The service that serves the staff car park also serves the car hire centre and rental companies and all stops in between including the Holiday Inn Express, the TUI Airways HQ And the ID Unit. A new fleet of six Mercedes-Benz Citaro buses were purchased for these operations during 2014.

A range of other bus services operated by off-site parking companies also serve the airport. These include Airparks, Paige Airport Parking, Centrebus and Coach Hire 4 U. The latter two operators provide staff shuttle buses on behalf of TUI and EasyJet.

An airport shuttle bus linking the airport and Luton Airport Parkway railway station is being replaced by the Luton DART rail transit, which came into service in March 2023.

In popular culture
 London Luton Airport appeared in two fly-on-the-wall television documentaries, Airline (1998) and Luton Airport (2005). Airline followed the staff of EasyJet at Luton and the airline's other bases across the country whilst the 2005 series followed the life of employees in a similar format to the show Airport, set in Heathrow Airport.
 The airport was mentioned in a 1977 television advert for Campari featuring Lorraine Chase, with the punch line "Were you truly wafted here from paradise?" — "Nah, Luton Airport". This advert was the inspiration for the 1979 UK hit song "Luton Airport" by Cats UK.
 In the Spitting image TV skit for "The Chicken Song", Luton Airport appears for a brief few seconds at the beginning. 
 The first episode of the second series of the BBC sitcom One Foot in the Grave is entitled In Luton Airport No-One Can Hear You Scream.
 Luton Airport was mentioned in the Piranha Brothers sketch from Monty Python's Flying Circus, as being the place where one of the brothers, Dinsdale, thinks that a giant hedgehog named Spiny Norman sleeps.
 In 2011 the airport featured in an episode of the series Supersize Grime which focused on the cleaning of an Airbus A321 at the Monarch Aircraft Engineering hangar 127.

Accidents and incidents
 4 November 1949: A Hawker Tempest single-engined piston fighter being operated by Napier Aircraft on a test flight crashed at the airport, killing the test pilot.
 23 December 1967: A Hawker Siddeley HS 125 (registration: G-AVGW) of Court Line crashed shortly after taking off from Luton Airport, killing both pilots. The aircraft had been on a training flight. The crash occurred when the crew simulated an engine failure on takeoff. The HS 125 lost height rapidly and hit the roof of a nearby factory. This resulted in a post-crash fire.
 3 March 1974: A Douglas DC-7C/F (registration: EI-AWG) operating an Aer Turas Teo charter flight from Dublin landed on runway 08 just after midnight but failed to achieve reverse thrust. Normal braking application also appeared to the crew to be ineffective and the emergency pneumatic brakes were applied. All main wheel tyres burst. The aircraft overran the runway and continued over the steep bank at the eastern perimeter finally coming to rest in soft ground 90 metres beyond. The situation had also been made worse by an inadvertent application of forward thrust by the crew in trying to achieve reverse thrust. Three of the six passengers and two of the four crew were injured. The aircraft was badly damaged and deemed a write-off.
 18 April 1974: A BAC One-Eleven 518FG (registration: G-AXMJ) operating Court Line Flight 95 was involved in a ground collision with Piper PA-23 Aztec (registration: G-AYDE) after the Aztec entered the active runway without clearance. The pilot of the Aztec was killed and his passenger was injured. All 91 people on board the One-Eleven successfully evacuated after take-off was aborted.
 21 June 1974: A Boeing 727-46 (registration: G-BAEF) operating a Dan-Air charter flight to Corfu hit the localiser antenna while taking off, thereby rendering the runway's ILS inoperative. After being told by Luton air traffic control about the incident, the crew flying the aircraft elected to divert to London Gatwick where it landed safely without harming its 134 occupants (eight crew members and 126 passengers). The subsequent investigation revealed that the aircraft only just became airborne at the end of the runway, and as the ground fell away to the Lea valley below, the aircraft actually followed a downsloping course until finally gaining positive climb. The report concluded that there had been a cumulative effect of three factors – erosion of take-off run available; delay in starting rotation; and a very slow rate of rotation – as a result of the flightdeck crew's miscalculation of the aircraft's takeoff weight (too high), a wrong pressure ratio for two of the aircraft's three engines (too low) and a sub-optimal choice of runway based on the use of outdated wind information that omitted the latest update's tailwind component.
 29 March 1981: A Lockheed JetStar 1329 (registration: N267L) operating an inbound flight from Nigeria overran runway 08 and came to rest down the embankment beyond the eastern perimeter fence. The accident was caused because the pilot landed well past the touchdown zone in poor visibility at night. At the time runway 08 did not have an ILS. The co-pilot suffered severe spinal injuries but the commanding pilot and seven passengers escaped with only minor injuries.
 15 January 1994: A Bell 206B JetRanger helicopter (registration: G-BODW) rolled over on takeoff. One of the rotor blades sliced into the cabin, killing the pilot. The aircraft was badly damaged and deemed a write-off.
 18 July 2022: During the 2022 United Kingdom heat wave, and with air temperatures close to 40°C (104°F) the runway melted and flights were forced to be diverted to Stansted, Bristol and other nearby airports. This led to severe delays for flights to and from the airport. The issue was rectified on the same day with flights resuming by the evening.

Future expansion plans

In February 2019, London Luton Airport Limited announced plans to expand the airport by building a second terminal. The expansion would increase airport capacity to handle 32 million passengers per year 2039. The enlarged airport would continue to operate using the existing single runway.

LLAL have outlined several options for the site of the new Terminal 2. Most of the proposals involve a development that will encroach upon Wigmore Valley Park, a designated County Wildlife Site; an alternative site to the east would encroach upon the London Green Belt, and a further option proposes siting a new terminal to the south of the runway. A public consultation in October 2019 included plans for a third stop on the Luton DART transit, currently under construction.

See also
 Airports of London
 List of airports in the United Kingdom and the British Crown Dependencies
 Transport in Luton

Notes

References

External links

London Luton Airport Limited
London Luton Airport Consultative Committee
Interactive flight radar map of London Luton Airport

 
Airports in the London region
Airports in the East of England
Airports established in 1938
Luton
Transport in Bedfordshire
Buildings and structures in Bedfordshire
Transport in Luton/Dunstable Urban Area
Airports in Bedfordshire
1938 establishments in England